Younes Namli (born 20 June 1994) is a Danish professional footballer who plays as a winger for Dutch club Sparta Rotterdam.

Career
After spending three seasons in the Danish 1st Division with AB, Namli signed a two-and-a-half-year contract with Dutch club Heerenveen in January 2015 following a successful trial. There was little interest, and no bids, from any other Danish clubs, something which surprised Thomas Nørgaard, his manager at AB, who praised Namli's talent. He was previously listed in September 2014 as a star for the future by Danish magazine BT.

After two seasons in Heerenveen, it was reported in June 2017 that Namli had signed a contract with another Dutch team, PEC Zwolle.

On 22 May 2019, he signed a four-year contract with Russian Premier League club FC Krasnodar.

On 15 January 2020, the Colorado Rapids acquired Namli on a two-year loan from FC Krasnodar. Namli appeared in 18 matches, including MLS Cup Playoffs, and adding two goals and four assists, and he also completed 66 dribbles, which was the second-highest in MLS that season. Namli was named to the MLS Team of the Week in Week 11 for his two-assist performance to help Colorado defeat Real Salt Lake, and reclaim the Rocky Mountain Cup. Following the 2021 season, Colorado declined their purchase option on Namli.

On 11 January 2022, he joined Sparta Rotterdam back in the Netherlands on loan until 30 June 2022. On 2 July 2022, Namli's agent stated that his contract with Krasnodar had been terminated.

On 11 July 2022, Namli returned to Sparta Rotterdam on a one-year contract.

Personal life
Namli is of Moroccan origin.

Career statistics

References

External links
 

1994 births
Living people
Danish men's footballers
Akademisk Boldklub players
SC Heerenveen players
PEC Zwolle players
FC Krasnodar players
Colorado Rapids players
Sparta Rotterdam players
Danish 1st Division players
Eredivisie players
Russian Premier League players
Association football wingers
Danish expatriate men's footballers
Danish expatriate sportspeople in the Netherlands
Expatriate footballers in the Netherlands
Danish expatriate sportspeople in Russia
Expatriate footballers in Russia
Danish expatriate sportspeople in the United States
Expatriate soccer players in the United States
Danish people of Moroccan descent
Designated Players (MLS)
Major League Soccer players
Footballers from Copenhagen